Hamaneh (also Romanized as Hāmāneh; also known as Hamaneh Kazabat, Hāmāneh-ye Kezāb, and Hāmāneh-ye Kez̄āb) is a village in Kezab Rural District of Khezrabad District of Ashkezar County, Yazd province, Iran. At the 2006 National Census, its population was 187 in 60 households. The following census in 2011 counted 442 people in 137 households. The latest census in 2016 showed a population of 377 people in 124 households; it was the largest village in its rural district.

References 

Ashkezar County

Populated places in Yazd Province

Populated places in Ashkezar County